is a Hawaiian  term meaning "family" (in an extended sense of the term, including blood-related, adoptive or intentional).
The term is cognate with Māori , meaning "nest".

In contemporary Hawaiian real estate jargon, an " unit" is a type of secondary suite.  It is a part of a house or a separate structure on the same lot that may contain a relative but which may not be rented to the general public.

In popular culture

The word is referenced in Disney's 2002 film, Lilo & Stitch, and throughout its franchise ("Ohana means family. Family means nobody gets left behind—or forgotten.").

See also
 
 
  bar

References
 
 City & County of Honolulu 2003.  Land Use Ordinance

Citations 

Hawaii culture
Hawaiian words and phrases